Events in the year 1895 in Venezuela.

Incumbents
President: Joaquín Crespo

Events
February 22 - Venezuela Crisis of 1895: United States President Grover Cleveland signs into law U.S. House Resolution 252, recommending Venezuela and the United Kingdom settle the dispute by arbitration.
December 17 - Venezuela Crisis of 1895: U.S. President Cleveland asks the U.S. Congress to fund a commission to study the boundaries between Venezuela and British Guiana
December 18 - Venezuela Crisis of 1895: the U.S. Congress approved $100,000 for the United States Commission on the Boundary Between Venezuela and British Guiana

Deaths

References

 
Venezuela
Venezuela
1890s in Venezuela
Years of the 20th century in Venezuela